Bossiaea barbarae is a species of flowering plant in the family Fabaceae and is endemic to Western Australia. It is an erect, compact, spiny shrub with egg-shaped to elliptic or oblong leaves, and deep yellow and bright red flowers.

Description

Taxonomy and naming
Bossiaea barbarae was first formally described in 2006 by James Henderson Ross in the journal Muelleria from specimens collected near Salmon Gums in 1998. The specific epithet (barbarae) honours "Barbara Archer of Norseman", the collector of the type specimens.

Distribution and habitat
This bossiaea usually grows near the edges of salt lakes in the Coolgardie, Esperance plains and Mallee biogeographic regions of Western Australia.

Conservation status
Bossiaea barbarae is classified as "not threatened" by the Government of Western Australia Department of Parks and Wildlife.

References

barbarae
Eudicots of Western Australia
Plants described in 2006